Sarah Wild is a South African science journalist and author. In November 2017 she became the first African to win a AAAS Kavli Science Journalism Award.

Wild is the author of Searching African Skies: The Square Kilometre Array and South Africa’s Quest to Hear the Songs of the Stars (2012) and Innovation: Shaping South Africa through Science (2015), which was published in Afrikaans as Innovasie: Hoe wetenskap Suid-Afrika vorm.

Wild was named the Siemens pan-African Profile Awards for science journalism winner in 2013, and received the Dow Technology and Innovation Reporting award at the 2015 CNN Multichjoice African Journalist of the Year awards.

Wild has written for Scientific American, The Guardian, The Atlantic, Undark Magazine, AfricaCheck and Mail & Guardian.

References

External links

Living people
Rhodes University alumni
South African women writers
Year of birth missing (living people)